Talofibular ligament can refer to:
 Anterior talofibular ligament (ligamentum talofibulare anterius)
 Posterior talofibular ligament (ligamentum talofibulare posterius)